Alfonso de Talavera, O.S.H. or Alfonso de Guzman was a Roman Catholic prelate who served as the first Bishop of Comayagua (1531–1540).

Biography
Alfonso de Talavera was ordained a priest in the Order of Saint Jerome.
In September 1531, he was appointed during the papacy of Pope Clement VII as Bishop of Comayagua.
He served as Bishop of Comayagua until his resignation in 1540.

References

External links and additional sources
 (for Chronology of Bishops) 
 (for Chronology of Bishops) 

16th-century Roman Catholic bishops in Honduras
Bishops appointed by Pope Clement VII
Hieronymite bishops
Roman Catholic bishops of Comayagua